Lord Mackenzie may refer to:

Brian Mackenzie, Baron Mackenzie of Framwellgate, member of the House of Lords
Donald Mackenzie (advocate) (1818–1875), Scottish judge, styled Lord Mackenzie
Earl of Seaforth, a title of the Mackenzie family in the seventeenth and eighteenth centuries
Kenneth Mackenzie, 1st Lord Mackenzie of Kintail (died 1611), Highland clan chief
Hector MacKenzie, Baron MacKenzie of Culkein (born 1940), Scottish nurse and former trade union official
 Lord Muir Mackenzie